A. J. Thomas (born September 18, 1999) is an American football safety for the Chicago Bears of the National Football League (NFL). He played college football at Western Michigan.

Professional career
After going unselected in the 2022 NFL Draft, Thomas was signed by the Chicago Bears as an undrafted free agent.  He was released on August 30, during the final roster cuts, and was signed to the practice squad the next day. Thomas was elevated to the active roster on November 29, and made his NFL debut on December 4 against the Green Bay Packers, recording one tackle while appearing on 13 snaps.

References

External links
Chicago Bears bio
Western Michigan Broncos bio

1999 births
Living people
American football safeties
Western Michigan Broncos football players
Chicago Bears players